Lespedeza thunbergii is a species of flowering plant in the legume family known by the common names Thunberg's bushclover, Thunberg's lespedeza, and shrub lespedeza. It is native to China and Japan.

They die back completely at the end of the season. The abundant pink to purplish flowers bloom in late summer. The fruit is a legume pod containing black seeds.

The specific epithet thunbergii refers to the 18th-century Swedish botanist Carl Peter Thunberg.

In cultivation this plant has gained the Royal Horticultural Society's Award of Garden Merit.  It has been used to provide habitat for game animals, often alongside switchgrass. Cultivars include 'VA-70', 'Amquail', 'White Fountain', and 'Gibraltar'. This species has the capacity to become invasive.

References

External links 

USDA Plants Profile

thunbergii
Flora of China
Flora of Japan
Taxa named by Augustin Pyramus de Candolle